Rhyme 'n' Reason was a racehorse who won the Grand National in 1988.	
Ridden by Brendan Powell and starting at odds of 10/1, he finished the race four lengths clear of Durham Edition. It was his first and last time competing in the Grand National.

Grand National record

References

External links
Irish Racing Profile

Steeplechase racehorses
National Hunt racehorses
Grand National winners
1979 racehorse births
Racehorses trained in the United Kingdom